Lindén is a Swedish surname. As of 2013, more than 6,000 people in Sweden have this surname. Notable people with the surname include:

Aki Lindén, Finnish politician
Alex Lindén, Swedish footballer 
Arvo Lindén (1887–1941), Finnish wrestler
Erik Lindén (1911–1992), Swedish athlete 
Erland Lindén (1880–1952), Swedish sailor 
Lars Lindén, Swedish politician
Pär Lindén (born 1966), Swedish sprint canoeist
Sara Lindén (born 1983), Swedish association football striker
Ulf G. Lindén (1937–2009), Swedish entrepreneur

See also
Linden (surname)

References

Swedish-language surnames